Thomas, Tom, or Tommy Kelly may refer to:

Entertainment
 Tommy Kelly (actor) (1925–2016), American actor in The Adventures of Tom Sawyer
 Tom Kelly (musician) (born 1946), American musician and songwriter
 "Shotgun" Tom Kelly (born 1949), American radio and television personality
 Thomas Vincent Kelly (active 1996–2009), American film and television actor
 Tom Kelly (actor), British television actor
Thomas Kelly (pianist), British pianist, prize-winner in 2021 Leeds International Piano Competition

Military
 Thomas Kelly-Kenny (1840–1914), Irish/British General, born Thomas Kelly
 Thomas Kelly (sailor) (1928–1947), British Merchant Navy seaman and George Cross recipient
 Thomas Kelly (Medal of Honor, 1898) (died 1920), U.S. Army soldier and Medal of Honor recipient during the Spanish–American War
 Thomas Kelly (Medal of Honor, 1864) (1837–?), Irish-born soldier in the Union Army
 Thomas J. Kelly (Medal of Honor) (1923–1988), U.S. Army soldier and Medal of Honor recipient during World War II
 Thomas W. Kelly (1932–2000), U.S. Army lieutenant general and Gulf War Pentagon spokesman

Politics
 Thomas Kelly (politician, born 1723) (1723–1809), Irish barrister, judge and politician
 Thomas J. Kelly (Irish nationalist) (1833–1908), Irish revolutionary and leader of the Irish Republican Brotherhood
 Thomas Kelly (Sinn Féin politician) (1868–1942), Irish Sinn Féin and later Fianna Fáil politician
 Thomas Kelly (Canadian politician) (1833–1893), Canadian lawyer, judge and politician in Prince Edward Island
 Thomas Kelly (New Zealand politician) (1830–1921), Member of Parliament in Taranaki, New Zealand
 Tom Kelly (SDLP politician), former Vice Chairman of the Social Democratic and Labour Party in Northern Ireland

Religion
 Thomas Kelly (hymn-writer) (1769–1855) Irish evangelical, founder of the Kellyites
 Thomas Kelly (archbishop of Armagh) (1781–1835), Irish prelate of the Roman Catholic Church
 Thomas Raymond Kelly (Quaker mystic) (1893–1941), American Quaker educator
 Thomas C. Kelly (1931–2011), Archbishop of Louisville

Sports

Football and rugby
 Thomas Kelly (rugby union) (1882–1959), England
 Tom Kelly (footballer, born 1885) (1885–1916), English professional footballer
 Tom Kelly (footballer, born 1919) (1919–1970), English professional footballer
 Tom Kelly (footballer, born 1964) (born 1964), Scottish professional footballer
 Tommy Kelly (footballer) (active 1966–1982), Irish
 Tom Kelly (Gaelic footballer) (active 1999–2010), former Gaelic football player
 Thomas Kelly (footballer), English footballer for Sunderland
 Tommy Kelly (born 1980), American football player for the New England Patriots

Other sports
 Thomas Kelly (cricketer, born 1844) (1844–1893), Australian cricketer
 Thomas Kelly (cricketer, born 2000) (born 2000), Australian cricketer
 Tom Kelly (basketball) (1924–2008), American engineer and professional basketball player
 Thomas Joseph Kelly (1919–2013), American trainer of Thoroughbred racehorses
 Tom Kelly (baseball) (born 1950), manager of the Minnesota Twins
 Tommy Spider Kelly (1867–1927), American boxer
 Toss Kelly (Thomas B. Kelly, 1862–1924), American baseball umpire

Other
 Thomas J. Kelly (aerospace engineer) (1929–2002), American
 Thomas J. Kelly (scientist) (born 1941), American cancer researcher
 Thomas Forrest Kelly (born 1943), American musicologist
 Thomas J. Kelly III (born 1947), American photojournalist
 Thomas Kelly (1994–2012), Australian assault victim
 Thomas P. Kelly III, American diplomat
 Thomas Kelly, one of the perpetrators of the Maungatapu murders.

See also
Thomas Kelley (disambiguation)
Thomas Kelly High School (opened 1928), American school in Chicago